Slobozia Nouă may refer to several places in Romania:

 Slobozia Nouă, a village in Stănișești Commune, Bacău County
 Slobozia Nouă, a district in the town of Slobozia, Ialomița County

and a village in Moldova:
 Slobozia Nouă, a village Tătărăuca Veche Commune, Soroca district